The 1998 OFC Women's Championship, also known as the VI Ladies Oceania Nations Cup was held in Auckland, New Zealand between 9 October & 17 October 1998. It was the sixth staging of the OFC Women's Championship. The 1998 OFC Women's Championship, like its previous edition, served as the OFC's qualifying tournament for the 1999 FIFA Women's World Cup. OFC's only berth was given to the winner – Australia.

Participating nations
Of the twelve nations affiliated to the Oceania Football Confederation, six entered the tournament.

Did not enter

First round

Group A

Group B

Knockout stage

Semi-finals

Third place playoff

Final
Australia won the tournament and qualified for 1999 FIFA Women's World Cup.

Awards

Goalscorers

15 goals
 Pernille Andersen
10 goals
 Sharon Black
8 goals
 Cheryl Salisbury
7 goals
 Sacha Haskell
5 goals
 Joanne Peters
 Wendi Henderson
4 goals

 Alicia Ferguson
 Julie Murray
 Katrina Boyd
 Lisa Casagrande
 Michele Cox
 Nicky Smith

3 goals
 Natalie Thomas
2 goals

 Angela Iannotta
 Amanda Crawford

1 goals

 Alison Forman
 Amy Duggan
 Anissa Tann
 Bridgette Starr
 Losana Kubulala
 Jennifer Carlisle
 Maia Jackman
 Melissa Ruscoe
 Nellie Taman

Unknown goalscorers

: 5 additional goals
: 15 additional goals

Own goal
 Unknown player (playing against New Zealand)

References

External links
Tables & results at RSSSF.com

Women's Championship
1998
1999 FIFA Women's World Cup qualification
1998
OFC
1998 in New Zealand association football
1997–98 in Australian women's soccer
1998 in New Zealand women's sport
October 1998 sports events in New Zealand
Association football in Auckland